In organosulfur chemistry, 1,3-dithioles are a class of heterocycles based on the parent compound 1,3-dithiacyclopentene (also known as 1,3-dithiole).  The ligand dmit2- is a 1,3-dithiole.  Heating solutions of Na2dmit gives the isomeric disulfide, a 1,2-dithiole.

References

Dithioles